Spencer Redford is an American former actress and singer, best known for her role as Loretta Modern in the Disney Channel Original Movie Pixel Perfect.

Early life
Redford was born in Rochester, Michigan, a northern suburb of Detroit. At a young age, she started dancing at Deborah's Stage Door. Spencer competed and won at Best New Talent in 2000. With the representation she received at the Showcase, she has booked many roles. She graduated from Rochester High School in 2001.

Career
Her other television credits include That's So Raven, Even Stevens, Joan of Arcadia, Arrested Development, Jake in Progress, Judging Amy and The Young and the Restless.

Redford's last acting role was in the 2007 film Look.

Filmography

Discography
 I Am Spencer (2004), an EP
 Wasted Space (2012)

References

External links
 

1983 births
Living people
21st-century American actresses
Actresses from Michigan
American child actresses
American television actresses
People from Rochester, Michigan